Parviturbo stearnsii is a species of sea snail, a marine gastropod mollusk in the family Skeneidae.

Distribution
This species occurs in the Pacific Ocean off Baja California.

References

External links
 To World Register of Marine Species

stearnsii
Gastropods described in 1918